Kaşdişlen is a village in Anamur district of Mersin Province, Turkey. At  it is almost merged to Anamur. The population of Kaşdişlen is 484  as of 2011.

References

Villages in Anamur District